Soveyseh-ye Sadat (also Romanized as Soveyseh-ye Sādāt; also known as Soveyseh-ye Yek) is a village in Soveyseh Rural District, in the Soveyseh District of Karun County, Khuzestan Province, Iran. At the 2006 census, its population was 503, in 76 families.

References 

Populated places in Karun County